Twin Islands is an island of the Andaman Islands. It belongs to the South Andaman administrative district, part of the Indian union territory of Andaman and Nicobar Islands.

Geography
The islands belongs to the Rutland Archipelago and are located west of Bada Khari.

Administration
Politically, Twin Islands are part of Port Blair Taluk.

Demographics 
The islands are uninhabited.

References 

South Andaman district
Islands of South Andaman district
Archipelagoes of the Andaman and Nicobar Islands
Uninhabited islands of India
Islands of India
Islands of the Bay of Bengal